Vintage Vibe is a manufacturer of electric pianos, based in Rockaway, New Jersey. The company also offers repair and restoration services for electric pianos, keyboard instruments and amplifiers, brand new parts for vintage electric pianos, and manufactures a modern tine-based electro-mechanical piano.

History 
The company started in 1997 as an instrument rental business, before switching to repairs due to difficulties competing in that market. In 2011, they started manufacturing electric pianos, similar to those manufactured by Rhodes and Wurlitzer.

Pianos

Vintage Vibe Piano
Vintage Vibe debuted their tine based piano, at the 2011 NAMM Show in Anaheim, California. The electric piano combines the sound of a Rhodes with a body that resembles a Wurlitzer Electric Piano. The Vintage Vibe Piano was designed to be half the weight of traditional tine-based electric pianos. The action and tone are inspired by the early Fender Rhodes.
The piano uses American swaged steel tines and hand-wound pickups along with a choice of active or passive electronics to achieve its tone.  The Vintage Vibe Piano is available in a number of different variants.
 44 Note (F21 - C64)
 44 Note Bass Model (C4 - G46)
 64 Note (A13 - C76)
 73 Note (E8 - E80)

Vibanet
The Vibanet was introduced at the 2013 NAMM show. Unlike the tine based Vintage Vibe Piano, the Vibanet is modeled after the Hohner Clavinet, which is a string based electric piano. However, like the Vintage Vibe Piano, the Vibanet was made with a modern approach. Also half the weight, the Vibanet's exterior has been redesigned for a sleek look and quick access to tuning pegs.

The Vibanet features 60 keys, an autowah preamp and a revolutionary dampening system using a polymer gel rather than the yarn used by Hohner.

Notable Users 
Stevie Wonder
Chick Corea
Gregg Phillinganes
Jeff Chimenti
The National
Jamiroquai
Gregg Allman
Peter Levin
Christian McBride
Richie Kotzen
Edie Brickell
Tom Furse of The Horrors
John Ginty (associated with The Dixie Chicks, Jewel, Santana, Bad Religion, and Robert Randolph & The Family Band)
Robert Glasper
Jem Godfrey associated with Joe Satriani, Steve Vai, Atomic Kitten
Peter Keys of Lynyrd Skynyrd
Marcel Rodríguez-López of The Mars Volta, and Zechs Marquise
Chris Norton of Zappa Plays Zappa
Knut Anders Sørum
Justin Vernon of Bon Iver & The Shouting Matches
Pierre Chretien (SoulJazz Orchestra)

References

External links

Piano manufacturing companies of the United States